The Eran boar inscription of Toramana, is a stone inscription found in Eran in the Malwa region of Madhya Pradesh, India. It is 8 lines of Sanskrit, the first three of which are in meter and the rest in prose, written in a North Indian script. The inscription names king Toramana, ruler of the Alchon Huns, as ruling over Malwa ("governing the earth") and records that a Dhanyavishnu is dedicating a stone temple to Narayana (Vishnu).

Date
The inscription does not give any date, but mentions Toramana is "governing the earth", which is interpreted to mean the Malwa region site where this inscription is found. According to Radhakumud Mookerji, this means that the inscription was made after 510 CE when the Gupta king Bhanugupta and his local chief Goparaja had lost Malwa region after Toramana's invasion. It must be before 513 CE, because Toramana died in Varanasi while on his campaign to conquer eastern India. 

The inscription was made by a Vishnu devotee named Dhanyavishnu, the younger brother of the deceased Maharaja Matrivishnu, who is the same person who also erected a pillar in Eran. John Fleet calls it an inscription belonging to 6th-century Vaishnavism, a tradition of Hinduism.

Description 
The inscription is written under the neck of the boar, in 8 lines of Sanskrit in the Brahmi script. The boar represents the God Varaha, an avatar of Vishnu. The inscription was found in 1838 by T.S. Burt, who brought it to the attention of James Prinsep. It was published in 1838 by Prinsep with a translation. In 1861, FitzEdward Hall disagreed with Prinsep's report and published a revised edition of the inscription and a new translation. Fleet published his own translation and interpretation of the inscription in 1888. The translations for the inscription vary significantly, though the central theme is similar.

The region around the inscription, the boar sculpture's wall is covered with reliefs, predominantly of rishis (sages) and saints of Hinduism. This iconography follows the Hindu texts where the boar avatar is symbolically shown to be protective of the saints and scholars. Goddess earth (Bhudevi, Prithivi) is depicted with a woman sculpture hanging on to the right tusk of the boar. On the shoulder of the boar is a small shrine. The boar along with the site is damaged, and cracks run across the boar, one of the cracks passes through the inscription.

John Fleet's Translation

The John Fleet translation of the inscription reads:
{{quote|
"Om ! Victorious is the god (Vishnu), who has the form of a Boar; who, in the act of lifting up the earth {out of the waters}, caused the mountains to tremble with the blows of {his} hard snout ; {and) who is the pillar {for the support) of the great house which is the three worlds !

(Line 1 .)— In the first year; while the Maharajadhiraja, the glorious Toramana of great fame {and} of great luster, is governing the earth.

(L. 2 .)— On the tenth day of (the month) Phalguna, — on this {lunar day}, {specified} as above by the regnal year and month and day, {and} invested as above with its own characteristics.

(L. 3 .)— By Dhanyayishnu,— the younger brother, obedient to him {and} accepted with favour by him, of the Maharaja Matrivishnu, who has gone to heaven; who was excessively devoted to the Divine One; who, by the will of (the god) Vidhatri, was approached {in marriage-choice} by the goddess of sovereignty , as if by a maiden choosing (him) of her own accord {to be her husband} ; whose fame extended up to the border of the four oceans; who was possessed of unimpaired honour and wealth ; {and} who was victorious in battle against many enemies; who was the son of the son’s son of Indravishnu; who was attentive to his duties; who celebrated sacrifices; who practiced private study {of the scriptures}; who was a Brahman saint; {and) who was the most excellent {of the followers} of the Maitreya clan {gotra} (Maitreya gotra came from the linage of sage Brighu) who was the son’s son of Varunavishnu, who imitated the virtuous qualities of {his} father;— and who was the son of Harivishnu, who' was the counterpart of {his} father in meritorious qualities, {and} was the cause of the advancement of his race

(L. 6.)— (By this Dhanyavishnu) accomplishing, in unison with {the previously expressed wishes of} him, a joint deed of religious merit, for the sake of increasing the religious merit of (his) parents, this stone temple of the divine (god) Narayana, who has the form of a Boar {and} who is entirely devoted to {the welfare of} the universe, has been caused to be made in this his own vishaya of Airikina.

(L. 8.)— Let prosperity attend all the subjects, headed by the cows and the Brahmans!
|Eran boar inscription, Translator: Fleet.

Hall & Cunningham Translation

See also
Gwalior inscription of Mihirakula

References

Bibliography
 

Sanskrit inscriptions in India
Gupta and post-Gupta inscriptions